Confrides is a municipality in the comarca of Marina Baixa in the Valencian Community, Spain.

See also
Abdet

References

Municipalities in the Province of Alicante
Marina Baixa